Innis Chonain or Innischonan is an island in Loch Awe, Scotland connected to the mainland by a bridge.

Architect, author and antiquarian Walter Douglas Campbell, a young brother of Archibald Campbell, 1st Baron Blythswood, purchased the island in the second half of the 19th century. He designed and built Innis Chonain House and also nearby St Conan's Tower for himself, his artist sister Helen and their mother the elderly Mrs Caroline Campbell of Blythswood House near Glasgow. Walter delighted in building unusual properties, including St Conan’s Kirk, which is on the mainland nearby, an eclectic blend of church styles.

Footnotes 

Islands of Loch Awe